A Funny Man is a 2011 Danish biographical drama film directed by Martin Zandvliet, and starring Nikolaj Lie Kaas, about the Danish actor and comedian Dirch Passer.

Cast
 Nikolaj Lie Kaas as Dirch Passer
 Lars Ranthe as Kjeld Petersen
 Lars Brygmann as Stig Lommer
 Malou Reymann as Bente Askjær (as Malou Leth Reymann)
 Morten Kirkskov as Ove Sprogøe
 Frederikke Cecilie Berthelsen as Inge (as Frederikke Cecilie Bertelsen)
 Silja Eriksen Jensen as Judy Gringer
 Laura Christensen as Hanne Passer
 Sarah Grünewald as Vicky
 Martin Buch as Preben Kaas
 Laura Bro as Sigrid "Sitter" Horne-Rasmussen
 Martin P. Zandvliet as Mus & Mænd instruktør
 Klaus Bondam as Hjertelæge

References

External links
 

2011 films
2011 drama films
2011 biographical drama films
2010s Danish-language films
Danish biographical drama films
Biographical films about actors
Biographical films about entertainers
Films about comedians
Films set in Denmark
Films shot in Denmark